Johnny English Reborn  is a 2011 spy action comedy film directed by Oliver Parker and written by Hamish McColl from a story by William Davies. A sequel to Johnny English (2003) and the second instalment in the Johnny English series, it is a British-American venture produced by StudioCanal, Relativity Media and Working Title Films, and distributed by Universal Pictures. The film stars Rowan Atkinson (reprising his role as the title character) alongside Gillian Anderson, Dominic West, Rosamund Pike, Daniel Kaluuya and Richard Schiff as new characters.

Much like its predecessor, the film parodies the James Bond film series and clichés of the spy genre and marks Atkinson and Tim McInnerny's second collaboration after the series Blackadder. Johnny English Reborn was met with mixed reviews but has grossed a total of $160 million worldwide.

The film was released in the United Kingdom on 7 October 2011, and topped the country's box office.
It was later released in North America on 21 October 2011. A sequel to the film, Johnny English Strikes Again was released in October 2018.

Plot
Eight years after the events of the first film, Johnny English has been training at a monastery in Tibet to recover from the shame of a failed mission to protect the newly elected president in Mozambique, which cost him his knighthood. Called back into service by MI7 under new director Pamela "Pegasus" Thornton, English must investigate an assassination plot of the Chinese Premier during talks with the Prime Minister of the United Kingdom. He meets fellow agent Simon Ambrose, MI7's quartermaster Patch Quartermain, and junior agent Colin Tucker, assigned to be his assistant.

In Hong Kong, English finds former CIA agent Titus Fisher, a member of Vortex, the group responsible for sabotaging English's Mozambique mission. Vortex holds a secret weapon unlocked by three keys, held by himself and two others. Fisher is killed by an elderly assassin disguised as a cleaner, and an accomplice steals his key. English chases the thief and recovers the key, only for it to be stolen by a fake flight attendant en route to London. He is humiliated in a meeting with the Foreign Secretary and Pegasus when he attempts to present the key and the conspiracy. He compounds his disgrace by mistakenly attacking Pegasus’s mother twice at a children's party after encountering the Killer Cleaner.

Kate Sumner, MI7's resident behavioral psychologist, uses hypnosis to help English recall his suppressed memory of the Mozambique incident, revealing that another Vortex operative, former Russian KGB and renegade MI7 associate spy Artem Karlenko, is posing as millionaire Sergei Pudovkin. English and Tucker meet Karlenko at a golf course outside London, but the Killer Cleaner critically injures him during their game. English and Tucker bring Karlenko to a hospital by helicopter, but he dies after revealing the third key is held by a mole in MI7.

Over dinner, English confides with Ambrose about the mole, and Ambrose tells him that he suspects Quartermain. In the restaurant's toilets, Tucker confronts Ambrose about him being the traitor, but English naively dismisses Tucker, letting Ambrose go with Karlenko's key. English confronts Quartermain at a church, but realizes that he has been framed as the third Vortex member. Chased by MI7 agents, English manages to escape to Sumner's flat, after stealing Quartermain's heavily modified wheelchair.

Reviewing footage of the Mozambique mission, Sumner sees that the assassin was manipulated by a supposedly-destroyed mind control drug, Timoxeline Barbebutenol. Ambrose comes to pick her up, and English realizes that he is the mole and third member of Vortex. Evading the Killer Cleaner by jumping down a rubbish chute, English goes to the flat where Tucker lives with his mother; English apologizes to Tucker and persuades him to join in infiltrating Le Bastion, a nigh-impregnable fortress in the Swiss Alps where the talks are to be held.

At the fortress, English accidentally activates a distress beacon, alerting the guards to their presence. He commands Tucker to knock him out and put him inside a body bag, so that they will be taken into the fortress. Inside, English manages to escape the body bag and warns Pegasus of the threat, but accidentally consumes a drink spiked with the drug, and subdues Pegasus on Ambrose's command.

Assigning English as the Prime Minister's bodyguard in place of Pegasus, Ambrose orders him to assassinate the Chinese Premier using a pistol disguised as lipstick, initially designed for Pegasus; thanks to his monastic training, English tries to resist the drug. Tucker interrupts Ambrose's communication feed with music before Ambrose resets it, exposing himself as the traitor. English resists again and shoots Ambrose, who escapes, while the drug enters its lethal stage and English loses consciousness.

Sumner arrives and revives English with a passionate kiss. English pursues Ambrose down the mountainside, and they engage in a fistfight in a cable car. English overpowers Ambrose, but falls out of the carriage. Ambrose shoots at him, who tries to use his spy umbrella as a bulletproof shield, which is actually a missile launcher when he closes it. The missile destroys the carriage, killing Ambrose.

Vortex is shut down and English has his knighthood reinstated by Her Majesty the Queen. During the ceremony, the Killer Cleaner, disguised as the Queen, attacks English with the knighting sword before fleeing, leading English to restrain the real Queen. He only realises his mistake when the assassin is caught by the royal guards and police.

During the credits, English prepares dinner for Sumner to the tune of "In the Hall of the Mountain King".

Cast
 Rowan Atkinson as Johnny English, an accident prone but good hearted MI7 agent.
 Gillian Anderson as Pamela Thornton / Pegasus, the head of MI7.
 Dominic West as Simon Ambrose, an MI7 agent and colleague of English.
 Rosamund Pike as Kate Sumner, a behavioural psychologist at MI7, and English's love interest.
 Daniel Kaluuya as Colin Tucker, an MI7 agent who becomes English's assistant and sidekick in his mission.
 Richard Schiff as Titus Fisher, an ex-CIA operative.
 Tim McInnerny as Patch Quartermain, MI7's wheelchair-using quartermaster.
 Pik-Sen Lim as the Killer Cleaner, a Vortex assassin disguised as a grey-haired house cleaner. 
 Stephen Campbell Moore as the Prime Minister of the United Kingdom
 Burn Gorman as Slater, a MI7 intelligence expert who works with Ambrose. 
 Togo Igawa as Ting Wang, English's mentor in Tibet and a MI7 sleeper agent.
 Mark Ivanir as Artem Karlenko, a former Russian KGB double agent.
 Benedict Wong as Chi Han Ly

Additionally, Atkinson's daughter Lily has a cameo appearance in the film as the girl who gets her helmet stolen by English. Joséphine de La Baume plays Madeleine, a deceivingly charming member of Vortex, responsible for luring English off his post in Mozambique. Williams Belle as Ling, a Vietnamese henchman working for Vortex, who works with the killer cleaner. Benedict Wong portrays Chi Han Ly, a Chinese official conspiring with Simon to take out Xiang Ping. Paul Che and Courtney Wu appear as Chinese men in spectacles. Rupert Vansittart, who had previously appeared with Atkinson in several episodes of Mr. Bean, appears as a rich yacht owner.
Miles Jupp cameos as a technician in Patch's lab. Ben Miller reprised his role of Angus Bough from the previous film in one scene, but was cut from the final film. He would later reprise his role as Bough in Johnny English Strikes AgainProduction

On 28 March 2007, Atkinson confirmed on Richard & Judy that a script for a second film was being worked on. In an interview for Mr. Bean's Holiday, Atkinson also stated that there was quite a moderate chance for a sequel. On 8 April 2010, Universal Pictures announced that they were producing a sequel to Johnny English, taking place seven years following the first film.

In June 2010, it was announced that Daniel Kaluuya had been added to the cast. In July 2010, Ben Miller, who featured as the sidekick 'Bough' in Johnny English, said he had not been approached to reprise his role. On 10 July 2010, Deadline Hollywood reported that Gillian Anderson would be playing a MI7 secret agent named Pamela Head.

Filming began on 11 September 2010, in Central London at Cannon Street, with further production scheduled for the week beginning 13 September 2010, at Brocket Hall, Hertfordshire and later in Hawley Woods in Hampshire, Macau and Hong Kong.

Filming took place on The Mall, London in Central London on 25 September 2010. Filming also took place in Kent, along the A299 carriageway and Cliffs End, Ramsgate. The  "Johnny English Theme" song from the original film is used four times in the score. Ben Miller, who played Bough in the previous movie, appeared, but his scenes were cut from the final film.

Car

The car that Johnny English drives was a Rolls-Royce Phantom Coupé with an experimental 9.0 litre V16 engine. There are only a few of these engines in existence, produced during tests for the Phantom Coupé, and they were not used in production models. For the production of the film, Atkinson approached the company and requested that they install one into a car, making the vehicle seen in the film unique.

ReleaseJohnny English Reborn was originally going to be released on 29 July 2011. The film was then pushed back to 16 September 2011, however, it was delayed again; this time to 7 October 2011.

Home mediaJohnny English Reborn was released on DVD and Blu-ray combo pack featuring the first film on 14 February 2012 in the United Kingdom, and on 28 February 2012 in North America.

Reception
Box officeJohnny English Reborn opened to an estimated $3,833,300 in its first weekend in United States and Canada. In the United Kingdom, it grossed $7,727,025, $2,628,344 in Australia, and $3,391,190 in Germany. After five weeks in release, it grossed $8,305,970 in the United States and Canada and $151,772,616 elsewhere, bringing to a total of $160,078,586.

Critical response
Much like its predecessor, the film received mixed reviews from critics. Review aggregator Rotten Tomatoes reports that 38% of 91 critics have given the film a positive review, with a rating average of 4.81/10. The website's consensus is "Arguably a marginal improvement on its mostly forgotten predecessor, Johnny English Reborn nonetheless remains mired in broad, tired spy spoofing that wastes Rowan Atkinson's once considerable comedic talent". Metacritic gives the film a weighted average score of 46 out of 100 based on reviews from 20 critics, indicating "mixed or average reviews". CinemaScore polls reported that the average grade moviegoers gave the film was a "B" on an A+ to F scale.

On the Australian television programme At the Movies, Margaret Pomeranz rated the film 3 stars and David Stratton rated the film 2 stars (out of 5). Indian film critic Nikhat Kazmi of the Times of India'' gave the film a positive review praising Atkinson's characteristic flair for comedy once again, giving it a 4 star rating out of 5.

Accolades

Sequel

In May 2017, it was announced that pre-production had begun on a third film, which was released on 5 October 2018.

Notes

References

External links

 
 
 Working Title Films

2011 films
2010s adventure comedy films
2010s parody films
2011 action comedy films
Johnny English
British action comedy films
British adventure comedy films
British parody films
British sequel films
British spy comedy films
American action comedy films
American adventure comedy films
American parody films
American sequel films
American spy comedy films
Films scored by Ilan Eshkeri
Films set in London
Films shot in Hampshire
Films shot in London
Films shot in Hong Kong
Films set in Hong Kong
Films shot in Macau
Films set in Mozambique
2010s spy comedy films
StudioCanal films
Working Title Films films
Relativity Media films
Universal Pictures films
Films produced by Eric Fellner
Films produced by Tim Bevan
Fiction about mind control
Films with screenplays by William Davies
British slapstick comedy films
2010s English-language films
2010s American films